The 1979 San Francisco 49ers season was the franchise's 30th season in the National Football League and their 34th overall. The season is noted for being O. J. Simpson's final year and Joe Montana's first season, as well as Bill Walsh's first year as 49ers head coach.

The 1979 49ers are the only team in NFL history to lose 12 games in which they held a lead.

Offseason

NFL Draft

Personnel

Staff

Roster

Regular season

Schedule

Game summaries

Week 8

Week 15 vs Buccaneers

49ers' players carried Bill Walsh off the field and fans tore down the goal posts.

Standings

References

External links
 1979 San Francisco 49ers at Pro-Football-Reference.com

San Francisco
San Francisco 49ers seasons
1979 in San Francisco
San